Kroutil (feminine: Kroutilová) is a Czech surname. Notable people with the surname include:

 Marta Kroutilová (1925–2017), Czechoslovak sprint canoeist
 Ota Kroutil (born 1921), Czech sprint canoer
 Petr Kroutil (born 1973), Czech musician and actor

See also
 

Czech-language surnames